Mordhau may refer to:
Mordhau (video game)
Mordhau (weaponry), a sword holding technique

See also
Mordhaus, a fictional place in TV series Metalocalypse